John Henry IV of Gorizia (1322–1338) was a medieval Count of Gorizia and a member of the Meinhardiner dynasty.  He was the only surviving son of Henry III and his wife Beatrix of Lower Bavaria, the daughter of Duke Stephen I.  He succeeded his father as Count of Gorizia in 1323.  Because he was still a minor, his mother and his uncles Albert II of Gorizia and later Henry of Carinthia acted as regents. After 1329, the custody was taken over by his cousin Albert III. Since he died young, he never actually reigned himself. Nevertheless, in 1332, aged nine, he was elected as podesta of Trieste, in the city's attempt to forge an alliance with Gorizia against Venetian expansion.

In 1335, he was betrothed to Beatrice of Sicily, daughter of Elizabeth of Carinthia, Queen of Sicily. 
Elizabeth renounced her rights to Tyrol and Carinthia on Beatrice's behalf, but the betrothal was cancelled by John Henry's mother who decided to settle with the new Habsburg rulers of Carinthia. In 1335, with a treaty signed in Ljubljana, John Henry thus betrothed to Anna of Habsburg, the daughter of the anti-king Frederick the Fair, who was a second cousin in his mother. The two married soon thereafter but the marriage remained childless.

Since he died childless, he was succeeded by the sons of his uncle Albert II.  They were Meinhard VI (until 1385), Albert III (until 1374) and Henry V (until 1362).

He was buried in the abbey in Rosazzo in Friuli.

References

Counts of Gorizia
1320s births
Year of birth uncertain
1338 deaths